Jabalcón or Cerro Jabalcón is a mountain near the city of Baza in the Granada province in Spain. It reaches a height of 1,494 metres above sea level.

At the foot of Javalon are the Baños de Zújar (baths of Zújar). They maintain a temperature over 30°C all year round, and are heated by a geo-thermal source underground.

The mountain also has a church situated on top as well as television and other communication towers. Paragliders frequently launch from the top of here as the mountain is surrounded by relatively flat land.

Geology
Popular legend claims that this hill is an extinct volcano because of its dome-shape and the geo-thermal sources at its base. It is however an isolated limestone outcrop, made up of dolomite, similar to the composition of the Sierra de Baza mountains further away.

References

External links 
 View of Javalcon from Cortes de Baza 
Zújar, Granada

Mountains of Andalusia
Penibaetic System
One-thousanders of Spain